Euodynerus crypticus is a species of stinging wasp in the family Vespidae.

Subspecies
These three subspecies belong to the species Euodynerus crypticus:
 Euodynerus crypticus balteatus (Say, 1837) c g
 Euodynerus crypticus crypticus g
 Euodynerus crypticus stricklandi (Bequaert, 1940) c g
Data sources: i = ITIS, c = Catalogue of Life, g = GBIF, b = Bugguide.net

References

Further reading

External links

 

Potter wasps
Insects described in 1823